Winston Raymond Peters  (born 11 April 1945) is a New Zealand politician serving as the leader of New Zealand First since its foundation in 1993. Peters served as the 13th deputy prime minister of New Zealand from 1996 to 1998 and 2017 to 2020, the minister of Foreign Affairs from 2005 to 2008 and 2017 to 2020, and the treasurer of New Zealand from 1996 to 1998. He was a Member of Parliament (MP) from 1979 to 1981, 1984 to 2008 and 2011 to 2020.

Peters was born in Whangārei, and raised in Whananāki in rural Te Tai Tokerau before attending school in Dargaville. He is of mixed parentage, his father being Māori and his mother being of Scottish descent. Widely known simply as "Winston", Peters has had a long and turbulent political career since first entering Parliament following the National Party win of the 1978 general election. Throughout his career, he has called for more focused and restrictive immigration policies. He has advocated benefits for senior citizens, criticised the media and "elitism", and has favoured socially conservative policies.

Peters first served in the Cabinet as minister of Māori affairs when Jim Bolger led the National Party to victory in 1990. He was dismissed from this post in 1991 after criticising his own Government's economic, fiscal and foreign ownership policies. He resigned from the National Party to form the populist party New Zealand First in 1993. As leader of New Zealand First, he held the balance of power after the 1996 election and formed a coalition with the National Party, securing the positions of deputy prime minister and treasurer; the latter position created for Peters. However, the coalition dissolved in 1998 following the replacement of Bolger by Jenny Shipley as Prime Minister. In 1999, New Zealand First returned to opposition before entering government with Labour Party Prime Minister Helen Clark, in which Peters served as minister of foreign affairs from 2005 to 2008.

In the 2008 general election, after a funding scandal involving Peters and his party, New Zealand First failed to reach the 5% threshold. As a result, neither Peters nor New Zealand First were returned to Parliament. However, in the 2011 general election New Zealand First experienced a resurgence in support, winning 6.8% of the party vote to secure eight seats in Parliament. In the 2014 general election, NZ First gained 11 seats and finished with 8.66%. In the 2017 election, Peters lost his electorate seat of Northland but NZ First won 9 seats overall, with 7.2% of the party vote. Following the election, NZ First again held the balance of power and formed a coalition government with the Labour Party. Prime Minister Jacinda Ardern subsequently appointed Peters as deputy prime minister and minister of foreign affairs. Peters was acting prime minister from 21 June 2018 to 2 August 2018 while Ardern was on maternity leave. In the 2020 election, NZ First failed to reach the 5% threshold and again left Parliament, with Peters leaving government.

Early life and education
Peters's birth certificate records his birth in Whangārei and his registration as Wynston Raymond Peters. His father is of Māori descent and his mother has Scottish ancestry. His iwi affiliation is Ngāti Wai and his clan is MacInnes. Two of his brothers, Ian and Jim, have also served as MPs, and another brother, Ron, has also stood as a New Zealand First candidate. According to the journalist Ian Wishart, Peters had little exposure to the Māori language and culture during his childhood years due to vigorous assimilation policies that encouraged integration into Pākehā (New Zealand European) society.

He grew up on a farm in Whananaki, and after attending Whangarei Boys' High School and Dargaville High School, Peters studied at the Auckland Teachers' Training College. In 1966 he taught at Te Atatū Intermediate School in Auckland but the next year went to Australia where he became a blast-furnace worker with BHP in Newcastle and later a tunneler in the Snowy Mountains.

In 1970 Peters returned to New Zealand and studied history, politics and law at the University of Auckland. During his university years, Peters joined the New Zealand Young Nationals, the youth wing of the center-right New Zealand National Party, and became acquainted with Bruce Cliffe and Paul East, who later served as Cabinet ministers in the Fourth National Government. Like his brothers Ron, Wayne, and Allan, Peters played rugby. He was a member of the University Rugby Club in Auckland and captain of the Auckland Māori Rugby team. In 1973, Peters graduated with a BA and LLB. He married his partner Louise, and later worked as a lawyer at Russell McVeagh between 1974 and 1978.

Early political career

Peters entered national politics in 1975 general election, standing unsuccessfully for the National Party in the electorate seat of Northern Maori; he gained 1,873 votes, and became the first National candidate in a Māori seat for some years who did not lose his deposit. This followed a successful campaign by Peters and other members of his Ngāti Wai iwi to retain their tribal land in the face of the Labour government's plan to establish coastal-land reserves for the public. As a result, the government of the day took virtually no ancestral land in the Whangārei coastal areas, and the initiative helped inspire the 1975 Land March led by Whina Cooper.

Peters took his seat – six months after polling day – on 24 May 1979. He lost this seat in 1981, but in 1984 he successfully stood in the electorate of Tauranga.

On 16 December 1986 Peters exposed the Māori loan affair in Parliament; this involved the-then Māori Affairs Department attempting to raise money illegally through a NZ$600 million loan-package offered by the Hawaiian businessman Michael Gisondi and the West German businessman Max Raepple. Peters became the National Party's spokesperson on Māori Affairs, Consumer Affairs, and Transport. In 1987 Jim Bolger elevated him to National's Opposition front bench as spokesperson for Māori Affairs, Employment, and Race Relations. After National won the 1990 election, Peters became Minister of Māori Affairs in the fourth National government, led by Jim Bolger.

As Minister of Māori Affairs, Peters co-authored the Ka Awatea report in 1992 which advocated merging the Ministry of Māori Affairs and the Iwi Transition Agency into the present Te Puni Kōkiri (Ministry for Māori Development).
Peters disagreed with the National Party leadership on a number of matters—such as the Ruthanasia economic policies—and frequently spoke out against his party regarding them. This earned him popular recognition and support. However, his party colleagues distrusted him, and his publicity-seeking behaviour made him increasingly disliked within the party. While the party leadership tolerated differences of opinion from a backbencher, they were far less willing to accept public criticism from a Cabinet minister, which (they determined) was undermining the National government. In October 1991, Bolger sacked Peters from Cabinet.

Peters remained as a National backbencher, continuing to publicly criticise the party. In late 1992, when the National Party was considering possible candidates for the elections in the following year, it moved to prevent Peters from seeking renomination (under any banner). In Peters v Collinge, Peters successfully challenged the party's actions in the High Court, and in early 1993, he chose to resign from the party and from Parliament. This prompted a by-election in Tauranga some months before the scheduled general election. Peters stood in Tauranga as an independent and won easily.

Fourth National Government (1993–1999)
Shortly before the 1993 election, Peters established New Zealand First. He retained his Tauranga seat in the election. Another New Zealand First candidate, Tau Henare, unseated the Labour incumbent in Northern Maori, helping to convince people that New Zealand First was not simply Peters's personal vehicle. Peters started the Winebox Inquiry in 1994; which concerned companies using the Cook Islands as a tax haven.

During the 1992 and 1993 electoral reform referendums, Peters advocated the adoption of the mixed-member proportional (MMP) electoral system. In the 1996 general election, the MMP system delivered a large increase in representation for New Zealand First. Instead of the 2 seats in the previous parliament, the party won 17 seats and swept all of the Māori electorates. More importantly, it held the balance of power in Parliament. Neither National nor Labour had enough support to govern alone. Neither party could form a majority without the backing of New Zealand First, meaning Peters could effectively choose the next prime minister.

It was widely expected that he would throw his support to Labour and make Labour leader Helen Clark New Zealand's first female prime minister. Peters had bitterly criticised his former National colleagues, and appeared to promise that he would not even consider a coalition with Bolger. However, after over a month of negotiations with both parties, Peters decided to enter into a coalition with National. Michael Laws, then New Zealand First's campaign manager, later claimed that Peters had already decided to enter into an agreement with National and used his negotiations with Labour simply to win more concessions from Bolger.

Whatever the case, Peters exacted a high price for allowing Bolger to stay on as Prime Minister. Peters became Deputy Prime Minister and Treasurer (senior to the Minister of Finance), the latter post created especially for him. Initially, there were concerns about whether Peters would be able to work with Bolger, the National prime minister who had previously sacked him from Cabinet, but the two did not seem to have any major difficulties.

Later, however, tensions began to develop between Peters and the National Party, which only worsened after Jenny Shipley staged a party room coup and became prime minister. After a dispute over the privatisation of Wellington International Airport, Peters was sacked from Cabinet again on 14 August 1998. He immediately broke off the coalition and led New Zealand First back into opposition. However, several MPs, including deputy leader Henare, opted to stay in government and leave New Zealand First. It later came out that Henare had tried to oust Peters as leader, but failed. Henare and other disaffected NZ First MPs formed the short-lived Mauri Pacific party. None of the MPs who opted to stay in government retained their seats in the next election.

Fifth Labour Government (1999–2008)
New Zealand First was severely mauled in the 1999 election, which saw Labour oust National from power. The party suffered for the rash of party-switching. Additionally, there was a wide perception that Peters had led voters to believe a vote for New Zealand First would get rid of National, only to turn around and go into coalition with National.  New Zealand First collapsed to 4.3% of the vote. Under New Zealand's MMP rules, a party that falls below the 5% threshold can still qualify for MMP by winning one electorate seat. However, Peters just barely held onto Tauranga, defeating a National challenger by 63 votes. As a result, New Zealand First remained in parliament but was reduced to five seats. Still in opposition (to the Fifth Labour Government), Peters continued to promote his traditional policies, but also became more noticeably concerned about immigration policies.

In the 2002 election, Peters performed well once again, campaigning on three main issues: reducing immigration, increasing punishments for crime, and ending the "grievance industry" around Treaty of Waitangi settlements. This message regained much support for both Peters and his party, especially from among the elderly who had in the past backed Winston Peters, and New Zealand First won 10% of the vote and 13 seats. Peters seemed to hope that Labour would choose to ally with New Zealand First to stay in power. However, Clark explicitly rejected this possibility, instead relying on support from elsewhere.

In a speech at Orewa in 2005, he criticised immigration from Asian countries as "imported criminal activity" and warned that New Zealanders were "being colonised without having any say in the numbers of people coming in and where they are from". He also accused the Labour Party of having an "ethnic engineering and re-population policy". In July 2005, Peters said New Zealand should err on the side of caution in admitting immigrants until they "affirm their commitment to our values and standards".

2005 election

As the 2005 general election approached, Peters did not indicate a preference for coalition with either of the major parties, declaring that he would not seek the "baubles of office". He promised to either give support in confidence and supply to the party with the most seats, or to abstain from no-confidence votes against it, and that he would not deal with any coalition that included the Greens. He pledged to keep post-election negotiations to under three weeks following criticism of the seven-week marathon it took to broker a deal with National in 1996.

In the election, some of New Zealand First's traditional support moved to National. Peters himself narrowly lost his longstanding hold on Tauranga to National MP Bob Clarkson, but New Zealand First did well enough to receive seven seats (down from 13 in 2002), allowing Peters to remain in Parliament as a list MP. Soon after the 2005 election Peters launched a legal challenge against Clarkson. The case alleged that Clarkson had spent more than the legal limit allowed for campaign budgets during elections in New Zealand. This legal bid ultimately failed, with a majority of the judges in the case declaring that Clarkson had not overspent.

In negotiations with Helen Clark after the election, Peters secured the ministerial portfolios of Foreign Affairs and Racing in the Labour-led government, a move which apparently lay at odds with his earlier promise to refuse the "baubles of office". He was a member of the Executive Council, although he was outside cabinet; he was able to criticise the government in areas not related to his portfolios, which experts said was an unprecedented situation. Considering his previous comments relating to immigration, there were mixed reactions from commentators. His selection for the Foreign Affairs portfolio created some measure of surprise within the country and beyond. National Party leader Don Brash said the choice was "astonishing", because "the whole region distrusts Winston Peters – Australia, Asia [...]. I think putting him as minister of foreign affairs does huge damage for our international reputation." The Age, in Australia, expressed surprise that the position had been given to an "outspoken, anti-migrant populist [and] nationalist".

Allegations concerning Peters's involvement with Simunovich Fisheries and former Member of Parliament Ross Meurant, who was engaged as both adviser to Peters and in undefined business activities with Peter Simunovich (managing director of Simunovich Fisheries), culminated in a Parliamentary Select Committee enquiry into what became known as the 'scampi enquiry'. The enquiry cleared Peters, Simunovich and Meurant of any wrongdoing.

In October 2006, Peters affirmed that he would continue to serve as leader for the 2008 election.

SuperGold Card
The SuperGold Card has been one of Peters's flagship initiatives. As a condition of the 2005 confidence-and-supply agreement between New Zealand First and the Labour Government, Peters launched the SuperGold Card in August 2007. New Zealand First established a research team to design the SuperGold Card, which included public transport benefits like free off-peak travel (funded by the Government) and discounts from businesses and companies across thousands of outlets. Peters negotiated with then Prime Minister Helen Clark despite widespread opposition to the card on the grounds of high cost.

Party donations 
Peters attracted media attention in 2008 over controversial payments for legal services and party donations. He had received $100,000 in 2006 to fund legal costs of challenging the election of Bob Clarkson to the Tauranga electorate. The money came from Owen Glenn, a wealthy New Zealand businessman and philanthropist based in Monaco. Under parliamentary rules, any gift to MPs over the value of $500 must be declared. Peters denied knowing about the source of the money but this was not corroborated by his lawyer Brian Henry and Glenn contradicted Peters's denial.

The Vela family, prominent in the racing industry, had donated $150,000 to Peters over a four-year period. The payments were made in sums of $10,000 to remain within rules governing political party funding. The Dominion Post published details from New Zealand First sources that before the 2005 election $25,000 had been donated to the party from Sir Bob Jones via the Spencer Trust.  The Trust is administered by Wayne Peters, a brother of Winston Peters. Jones confirmed that he had paid the money to the Spencer Trust and was asked by Winston Peters to make the donation. Peters denies that he had asked Jones for a donation to the party. The donation was not declared to the Electoral Commission as required by law.

On 29 August 2008, Peters offered to stand down from his portfolios as Foreign Affairs and Racing Minister, pending an investigation by the Serious Fraud Office as to whether the donations from Sir Bob Jones and the Vela brothers reached New Zealand First as intended. On 10 September 2008, Winston Peters gave evidence to the Privileges Committee of the New Zealand Parliament in an attempt to refute evidence given by Owen Glenn. The Privileges Committee returned a report on 22 September recommending that Peters be censured for "knowingly providing false or misleading information on a return of pecuniary interests". Parliament passed a motion censuring Peters the following day.  All but three of the parties in Parliament (New Zealand First, Labour, and Progressives who abstained) supported the censure.

Peters was later cleared by the Serious Fraud Office with respect to political donations, however some matters were referred back to the Electoral Commission as it was determined that, while no fraud had taken place, some electoral law matters with regard to funding declarations were not complied with. The police subsequently decided that no offence had been committed. Peters has referred to the affair as part of the "most vicious character assassination seen in any campaign this country has ever witnessed" and unsuccessfully sued Television New Zealand for defamation.

2008 election

Peters tried to regain Tauranga in the 2008 election and lost to National's Simon Bridges by a margin of 11,742 votes, a much larger loss than in 2005. The loss was attributed to fallout from the fundraising scandal that was seen to have damaged Peters's credibility.

With New Zealand First falling to 4.07% of the party vote—and failing to win a single electorate—Peters and his party were shut out of the 49th New Zealand Parliament. In his concession speech, Peters promised, "This is not the end", and alluded to the fact that while New Zealand First would not have any members in Parliament, its 4.07% of the vote meant it was still New Zealand's fourth largest party (after National, Labour, and the Greens). Despite this, political commentators described the defeat as "the end of the road" for Peters.

In opposition (2008–2017)
Peters generally shunned the media spotlight following the 2008 election. In 2009, he caused a brief flurry of interest when it was revealed he was still using a ministerial car, some months after his election defeat. Later it was reported he had started writing a rugby column for a local magazine. He appeared on TV ONE's Q & A programme on 5 July 2009, confirming that he was still the leader of New Zealand First. He hinted at a political comeback and attacked the New Zealand government's review of the Foreshore and Seabed Act. In late 2010 and early 2011 Peters made a number of appearances on television and radio where he made it clear his and New Zealand First's intention to contest the 2011 election. New Zealand First's annual convention in July 2011 received widespread media coverage and somewhat restored the media's interest in Peters and the party.

2011 election

In the 2011 general election New Zealand First experienced a resurgence in support, winning 6.8% of the party vote to secure eight seats in Parliament. Shortly after the election, Peters stated that his party would be in opposition and hold the "balance of responsibility".

2014 election
During the 2014 general election, Winston Peters tactically endorsed the Labour candidate Kelvin Davis in the Te Tai Tokerau Māori electorate as a means of opposing the Mana Movement MP Hone Harawira. Harawira had formed an electoral pact with the Internet Party, which was funded by controversial internet entrepreneur Kim Dotcom. Peters denounced Dotcom as a "crooked German" who "had been here for five minutes". Peters was joined by Prime Minister and National Leader John Key and the Māori Party candidate Te Hira Paenga. As a result, Harawira was defeated during the 2014 election. During the election, New Zealand First increased their parliamentary representation further, winning 8.6% of the party vote to secure 11 seats in the New Zealand Parliament.

2015 Northland by-election

In 2015, National MP Mike Sabin was forced to resign, leaving his seat of Northland open. The seat, located in the Far North District, and its predecessors had been in National hands for decades. However, Peters ran for the seat and won it with a commanding majority—the first time that New Zealand First had won an electorate seat since 2005. With Peters resigning his list seat to take up the Northland seat, this allowed New Zealand First's representation in parliament to increase to 12, with Ria Bond, the next available candidate on New Zealand First's party list filling the vacant list seat.

2017 election
During the lead-up to the 2017 general election, Peters reaffirmed his support for the campaign by families of the victims of the 2010 Pike River Mine disaster to reenter the mine to recover their loved ones. Peters publicly stated that re-entry to the mine would be non-negotiable in any coalition deal and dismissed claims that it was too dangerous to re-enter the mine.

On 13 July, Peters traded barbs with Green Party MPs Barry Coates and Metiria Turei. Coates had written on the left-wing The Daily Blog that the Greens would prefer a snap election to being left out of a Labour and New Zealand First coalition government. Meanwhile, Turei had criticised what she alleged was Peters's "racist approach towards immigration". Peters responded that Coates' comments were the "height of stupidity". He also rejected Turei's claims that New Zealand First was racist and warned that there would be consequences for the Greens in any post-election talks. Green co-leader James Shaw later clarified that Coates' remarks did not represent Green Party policy.

At New Zealand First's convention in South Auckland on 16 July 2017, Peters announced that if elected his party would hold a double referendum on eliminating the Māori seats and reducing the number of MPs in Parliament from 120 to 100 in mid-term 2017–2020. Peters also outlined his party's policies which included reducing immigration to 10,000 a year and nationalising the country's banks. Peters also proposed making KiwiBank the New Zealand government's official trading bank. In terms of law and order, Peters said that his party would build no more prisons but would make prisoners do hard labour six days a week.

During the 2017 election held on 23 September, Peters lost his Northland electorate seat to the National candidate Matt King by a margin of 1,389 votes. Despite losing his seat, New Zealand First secured 7.2% of the party vote with the party's parliamentary presence being reduced from twelve to nine seats. Since Peters ranked first on the New Zealand First list, he remained in Parliament as a list MP.

Following the 2017 election, Peters entered into coalition–forming talks with senior figures from the National and Labour parties. Neither major party had enough support to govern alone. National Party leader and Prime Minister Bill English signalled an interest in forming a coalition with NZ First; a potential National–NZ First coalition would have had 65 seats between them, enough to govern without the need for support from other parties. Labour leader Jacinda Ardern announced that her party was considering a three-way coalition with NZ First and the Greens. Peters indicated that he would not make his final decision until the special votes results were released on 7 October 2017.

During negotiations with Ardern, Peters abandoned his party's policy to hold a referendum on Māori seats. He clarified that the defeat of the Māori Party during the 2017 election had eliminated the rationale for his call to abolish the Māori electorates. Peters stated that foreign ownership of homes would be one of the topics discussed during negotiations with both National and Labour. He also called for Labour to scrap its contentious water tax policy on farmers. Peters also refused to negotiate with the Greens directly on the grounds that they had campaigned on a partnership with Labour. He described the Greens as a minor party with a minimal role in any potential government.

Sixth Labour Government (2017–2020)

On 19 October 2017, Peters announced that New Zealand First would form a coalition with the Labour Party under Jacinda Ardern, citing changing international and internal economic circumstances as the reasoning behind his decision, coupled with a belief that a Labour government was best-placed to handle the social and economic welfare of New Zealanders in a global environment that was undergoing rapid and seismic change.

As part of the agreement, New Zealand First has four portfolios inside Cabinet and one outside. On 26 October 2017, Peters assumed the positions of Deputy Prime Minister, Minister of Foreign Affairs, Minister for State Owned Enterprises and Minister of Racing. On 19 January 2018, Prime Minister Jacinda Ardern announced that she was pregnant and that Peters would take the role of Acting Prime Minister for six weeks after the delivery, which happened on 21 June 2018. Peters managed the "day to day" business of the country while Ardern was on maternity leave—a first in modern politics. Ardern returned to the role of Prime Minister full-time on 2 August 2018.

In August 2019, Peters called for a binding referendum on the Government's proposed Abortion Legislation Bill, claiming that it had not been part of New Zealand First's coalition agreement with Labour. Peters's remarks surprised both Justice Minister Andrew Little of the Labour Party and NZ First MP and cabinet minister Tracey Martin, who had participated in months of negotiations on the bill. Peters also declared that New Zealand First MPs would not be allowed a conscience vote on the issue and would vote as a caucus to support the bill at first reading. He warned that NZ First would withdraw support if the proposed law was not put to a public referendum. Little rejected Peters's demands for a referendum on the grounds that the legislation was a parliamentary matter.

In October 2019 Peters announced $7.7 million investment into the SuperGold Card scheme. The "upgrade" includes a new website, a mobile app, and 500 new partner businesses.

According to The New Zealand Herald in July 2020, Peters's New Zealand First fully or partially achieved 80% of the 70 promises made by Ardern in order to secure its support for her premiership.

Foreign affairs

As Minister of Foreign Affairs, his commitments include the initiation of a closer economic relations agreement with the UK, Australia, Canada, and other Commonwealth countries and to work towards a bilateral free-trade agreement with the Russia-Belarus-Kazakhstan Customs Union. In July 2019, during a visit to Washington, DC, Peters proposed a bilateral free-trade agreement between New Zealand and the United States.

On 5 May 2020, Peters expressed support for Taiwan rejoining the World Health Organization during a press conference. Peter's announcement was welcomed by the Taiwanese Government, which reiterated its friendship with New Zealand. The New Zealand Government subsequently announced its support for Taiwan's bid to join the WHO, putting NZ alongside Australia and the United States who have taken similar positions. In response, the Chinese Embassy issued a statement reminding Wellington to adhere to the One China Policy. In response, Peters told the Chinese Ambassador to "listen to her master", and stated that New Zealand should follow Taiwan's example of making the wearing of face masks compulsory. Peter's remarks were criticised by Chinese Foreign Ministry spokesperson Zhao Lijian, who warned that they violated the One China Policy and would hurt China–New Zealand relations. Peters has stood by his remarks.

On 28 July 2020, Peters announced that New Zealand was suspending its extradition treaty with Hong Kong in response to the Hong Kong national security law, which he claimed "eroded rule of law principles" and undermined the "one country, two systems" rule. In response, the Chinese Embassy criticised the New Zealand Government for violating international law and norms, and interfering in China's internal affairs.

On 22 July 2020, Peters attracted media scrutiny for allegedly using his position as Minister of Foreign Affairs to get Antarctica New Zealand to arrange a taxpayer–funded trip to Antarctica for two wealthy friends. Peters defended his actions and claimed that he was trying to raise NZ$50 million in private sponsorship to offset some of the costs of the NZ$250 million redevelopment of New Zealand's Antarctic base Scott Base.

In response to evidence that Russian opposition leader Alexei Navalny was poisoned in September 2020, Peters called it "deeply troubling".

Superannuation payments 
In late August 2017, Peters admitted being overpaid in superannuation for seven years while living with his longtime partner Jan Trotman.  The overpayment occurred because the relationship status box on his application form was left blank. Peters stated that he and the Ministry agreed that there had been a payment error but said he had paid the money back – amounting to nearly $18,000.  Peters paid interest and penalties on the overpayment.

The overpayment was subsequently leaked to the media. Peters described it as a private matter and expressed outrage that it had been leaked. In 2019, while serving as Deputy Prime Minister, he took former National ministers Paula Bennett and Anne Tolley, the Ministry of Social Development, its former chief executive Brendon Boyle, and State Services Commissioner Peter Hughes to court seeking $450,000 from each defendant for breaching his privacy.

On 20 April 2020, Justice Geoffrey Venning of the Auckland High Court dismissed Peters's case against Bennett, Tolley, the Ministry of Social Development, Boyle, and Hughes on the basis that Peters had not been able to establish that they were responsible for the disclosure of the payment irregularity to the media. However, the High Court also ruled that Peters's privacy had been deliberately breached during the lead-up to the 2017 general election in order to publicly embarrass him and cause him harm.

On 20 July 2020, Winston Peters was ordered by the Auckland High Court Justice Venning to pay a total $320,000 to the defendants Bennett and Tolley, State Services Commissioner Peter Hughes, the Ministry of Social Development and its former chief executive Brendan Boyle. In response, Peters announced that he would appeal the High Court's judgment.

2020 general election
During the 2020 New Zealand general election held on 17 October, Winston Peters and his fellow NZ First MPs lost their seats after the party's share of the popular vote dropped to 2.6%, below the five percent threshold needed to enter Parliament. Peters continued to serve in a caretaker role until 6 November 2020 (the date the members of the next Parliament took their seats), after which he was replaced by Grant Robertson as Deputy Prime Minister, and Nanaia Mahuta as Minister of Foreign Affairs.

Out of parliament, 2020–present
On 20 June 2021, Winston Peters announced during New Zealand First's annual general meeting in East Auckland that he would continue leading the party for the 2023 general election. Peters also made a speech attacking the Labour, National and Green parties, the increasing use of the Māori language in official reports and public life, the Auckland cycle bridge, Auckland light rail, the Government's COVID-19 vaccination rollout, purchase of Ihumātao land, Bright Line Test, elimination of referenda on Māori wards, and so-called wokeness in New Zealand society. This speech marked his first major public appearance since the 2020 general election.

On 9 October 2021, Peters attracted media attention after he alleged that a female sex worker connected to the criminal organisation Mongrel Mob had caused the Northland Region's COVID-19 scare by traveling to Whangārei on false pretenses. Peters's allegation that the woman was linked to the Mongrel Mob was disputed by Mongrel Mob leader Harry Tam on Māori Television's Te Ao Māori News, who also threatened legal action. On 11 October, Peters criticised the Government's failure to prevent a COVID-19 breach in the Northland region involving the sex worker, which had led to an Alert Level 3 lockdown in the region. On 19 October, Peters apologised to Tam for alleging that he helped a COVID-19 positive case breach the Auckland border.

In February 2022, Peters expressed support for the Convoy 2022 New Zealand protest outside Parliament, which called for an end to vaccine mandates. On 22 February, Peters visited the Parliament protest camp with former New Zealand First Member of Parliament Darroch Ball. He claimed that the mainstream media had been gaslighting protesters and urged Ardern and her Cabinet to speak with protesters. 

On 3 May 2022, Peters was trespassed from Parliament for two years by the Speaker of the House Trevor Mallard for visiting anti-vaccine mandate protesters. In response, Peters announced that he would seek a judicial review of the trespass notice. In addition, several other people including former National MP Matt King  were issued with similar trespass notices. On 4 May, Mallard withdrew five of the trespass notices, including Peter's trespass notice, in response to Peter's threat to seek a judicial review.

Views and policies

Peters has been labelled a nationalist and a populist by political commentators. He favours cutting taxes; however, he was critical of the free market policies enacted by the fourth Labour and fourth National governments in the 1980s and 1990s, opposing privatisations and deregulation. His platform retains elements of National Party economic policy from the Muldoon era.

Peters supports compulsory superannuation schemes for all New Zealanders. He has cultivated support amongst the elderly in particular, and support for his party has been concentrated among New Zealanders over 60 years of age.

Peters is opposed to high levels of immigration, in order "to avoid New Zealand's identity, values and heritage being swamped". He has highlighted the "threat" of immigration in both cultural and economic terms. Peters has on several occasions characterised the rate of Asian immigration into New Zealand as too high; in 2004, he stated: "We are being dragged into the status of an Asian colony and it is time that New Zealanders were placed first in their own country." On 26 April 2005, he said: "Māori will be disturbed to know that in 17 years' time they will be outnumbered by Asians in New Zealand", an estimate disputed by Statistics New Zealand, the government's statistics bureau. Peters responded that Statistics New Zealand had underestimated the growth-rate of the Asian community in the past.

In 2012, Peters voted, together with all of his fellow New Zealand First MPs, against the Marriage Amendment Bill, which aimed to permit same sex marriage in New Zealand. Peters also had called for a referendum on the issue.

Peters has long advocated direct democracy in the form of "binding citizen initiated referenda", to create "a democracy that is of the people and for the people", while forcing government "to accept the will of the people". Peters has also used anti-establishment and anti-elite rhetoric, such as criticising what he regards as the "intellectually arrogant elite in government and bureaucratic circles".
He has a generally fraught relationship with the media, with media interactions often described as confrontational. Peters attributes the hostility of media coverage to foreign-ownership of New Zealand media assets and their political agenda.

In June 2016, Peters advocated interviewing immigrants and reducing immigration numbers between 7,000 and 15,000 a year on TVNZ's Q+A show. During the interview, he stated that he would want prospective migrants "to salute our flag, respect our laws, honour our institutions and, above all, don't bring absolutely anti-women attitudes with them, treating women like cattle, like fourth-class citizens". Peters also clarified that he was not opposed to refugees nor Muslim migrants per se. In addition, Peters argued that reducing immigration would stabilise the Auckland housing market and enable younger and poorer New Zealanders to buy their first home.

Also in June 2016, Peters backed Brexit and told the New Zealand Parliament that he hoped "Britain [will] show its independence from an ungrateful European parliamentary yoke and come back to the Commonwealth".

In March 2017, Peters criticised the then Foreign Minister Murray McCully for endorsing United Nations Security Council Resolution 2334 without consulting his fellow Cabinet ministers. The resolution controversially condemned Israeli settlement expansion in the West Bank and passed with the support of the United Nations Security Council including New Zealand, which held a rotating membership on the council.

Peters has condemned discrimination on the basis of religion and he denounced Islamophobia following the Christchurch mosque shootings. He called for the terrorist perpetrator to be deported to his home country Australia.
 
In March 2022, Indian drama film The Kashmir Files had received an R16 classification from the New Zealand Classification Office, with a scheduled release date of 24 March 2022. Members of the Muslim community, in New Zealand, raised concerns with chief censor David Shanks that the film could promote Islamophobia, citing intercommunal tensions relating to the film's release in India. Shanks stated that the film's R16 classification did not mean that the film was being banned. In response to the film's R16 classification in New Zealand, Peters  claimed that the film's age restricted classification amounted to censorship of terrorist actions during the 9/11 attacks and the Christchurch mosque shootings. He added that efforts towards combating Islamophobia should not be used to "shield the actions of terrorists in the name of Islam".

Honours and awards
On 21 May 1998, Peters was appointed to the Privy Council and gained the style of "The Right Honourable". 

In 2007, Peters was bestowed with the chiefly Samoan title Vaovasamanaia, meaning "beautiful, handsome, awesome, delighted and joyful".

See also
 Populism in New Zealand
 List of current foreign ministers
 Contents of the United States diplomatic cables leak (New Zealand)

References

Further reading

External links

 New Zealand First: Winston Peters biography
 The Beehive: Winston Peters biography
 Winston Peters – personal website

|-

|-

|-

|-

|-

|-

|-

|-

|-

|-

|-

1945 births
Deputy Prime Ministers of New Zealand
Māori MPs
New Zealand First MPs
New Zealand foreign ministers
New Zealand list MPs
New Zealand MPs for North Island electorates
New Zealand National Party MPs
Leaders of political parties in New Zealand
New Zealand people of Scottish descent
New Zealand rugby union players
Ngāti Wai people
People from Tauranga
People from Whangārei
University of Auckland alumni
Living people
Members of the New Zealand House of Representatives
Unsuccessful candidates in the 1981 New Zealand general election
Unsuccessful candidates in the 1975 New Zealand general election
Unsuccessful candidates in the 2008 New Zealand general election
Unsuccessful candidates in the 2020 New Zealand general election
People educated at Dargaville High School
People educated at Whangarei Boys' High School
New Zealand members of the Privy Council of the United Kingdom
21st-century New Zealand politicians
Candidates in the 2017 New Zealand general election
Members of the Cabinet of New Zealand